This page summarises the Australia national soccer team fixtures and results in 2017.

Summary
Australia continued qualification for the World Cup starting the second half of the fixtures in third position. Despite remaining undefeated with an away draw to Iraq and home wins over the United Arab Emirates and Saudi Arabia, by the middle of the year Australia hadn't improved from third, the position that sends a team into further qualification matches.

In June, following a loss in a home friendly against Brazil, the team travelled to Russia to compete in the 2017 FIFA Confederations Cup. Two draws and a loss resulted in Australia finishing third in the group and failing to progress any further.

World Cup qualification resumed later in the year and despite Australia sitting third in the group, an away win against Japan would have seen them qualify for the World Cup with a game to spare, however they lost the fixture 2–0. Despite winning the final game against Thailand, Australia finished third (due to Saudi Arabia having a better goal difference) and missed out on automatic qualification to the World Cup, and entered the AFC play-offs against Syria.

The first leg of the play-offs against Syria was played in Malacca, Malaysia, due to the Syrian Civil War. The match ended in a draw, with Australia taking the lead in the 1st half and Syria equalising in the 85th minute with a penalty. In the second leg, played in Sydney, Australia won 2–1 after extra-time thanks to a brace by Tim Cahill. With an aggregate score of 3–2, Australia qualified for the inter-confederation play-offs against Honduras (the 4th place team from CONCACAF).

The first leg of the inter-confederational play-offs was played in San Pedro Sula, Honduras and ended in a goalless draw. In the second leg at Stadium Australia in Sydney, captain Mile Jedinak scored a hat-trick leading Australia to a 3–1 victory and securing a berth at the 2018 FIFA World Cup.

On 22 November, after qualifying for the 2018 World Cup, coach Ange Postecoglou resigned from his position as coach of the team.

Record

Match results

Friendlies

World Cup qualifiers

Confederations Cup

Player statistics
Correct as of 15 November 2017 (v. ).
Numbers are listed by player's number in Confederations Cup, WC Qualification or last friendly played

References

External links
 Australia: Fixtures and Results

Australia national soccer team seasons
2017 national football team results